History of the Orthodox Church may refer to:

 History of the Eastern Orthodox Church
 History of Oriental Orthodoxy

See also 
 Orthodox (disambiguation)
 Orthodox Church (disambiguation)